Elvidio Flamini (3 January 1925 – 28 August 2008) was an Argentine wrestler. He competed in the men's Greco-Roman bantamweight at the 1948 Summer Olympics.

References

External links
 

1925 births
2008 deaths
Argentine male sport wrestlers
Olympic wrestlers of Argentina
Wrestlers at the 1948 Summer Olympics
Sportspeople from Santa Fe Province
20th-century Argentine people
21st-century Argentine people